Sligo Borough may refer to:
 Sligo a town in Ireland and until 2001 a borough
 Sligo Borough (Parliament of Ireland constituency)
 Sligo Borough (UK Parliament constituency)